"Darla" is episode 7 of season 2 in the television show Angel.  Written and directed by Tim Minear, it was originally broadcast on November 14, 2000, on the WB television network. In this episode, Angel tries to rescue Darla from the clutches of Wolfram & Hart and Lindsey's affections, as she suffers guilt of her demonic past.  Flashbacks show Darla as a syphilis-stricken prostitute being transformed into a vampire by the demonic Master, her retaliation when the Gypsies cursed Angelus with a soul, and the Boxer Rebellion in China.

Plot
Angel is trying to locate Darla, over the objections of the group, who suggest Wolfram & Hart may just be trying to keep him distracted. Gunn suggests that they probably have connections to the place where she's staying. The team at Angel investigations finds Darla's new home, and Angel starts to rush off, but Wesley stops him, saying that he and Gunn will look into the situation.

Angel leaves to go find Darla and help her. Angel confronts Lindsey in a parking garage. Lindsey tells him Darla is in trouble and that they plan to kill her. Angel promises to come back and kill him if he is lying. He finds and rescues Darla, who tells him that Angelus is the only one who understands her. She wants him to turn her back, saying she cannot bear to feel her own heartbeat. Angel tells her it is a gift to be human, but she disagrees and demands he "return the favor" for turning him into a vampire. Stunned at this rejection, Darla runs out of the office.

Interwoven with this narrative are scenes depicting Darla's past. She is made a vampire by the Master in 1609, Colony of Virginia. In 1760, Darla chooses Angelus over the Master and goes with him. In 1880, while strolling the streets of London, Angelus, Darla, and Drusilla bump into a man named William, later known as Spike. In need of companionship, Drusilla makes him into a vampire. During the Boxer Rebellion in China, Angel tracks down Darla, and asks her for a second chance to rule at her side.

Production
Composer Robert J. Kral says this is his favorite episode to have scored, as he was able to write several different themes for the character of Darla. He was asked by director Tim Minear to write music that was "epochy. Something with horns...something Wagnerish."  Kral and Buffy composer Thomas Wanker deliberately choose not to collaborate, so that the cross-over scenes would "maintain a different perspective," Kral says.

Production designer Stuart Blatt says the Boxer Rebellion flashback scenes in this episode and "Fool for Love" were filmed at a movie ranch with a standing set for a Mexican village. "Through our research," Blatt says, "we realized that a lot of Chinese towns looked very similar to small Mexican villages...clay adobe structures with either thatched or tower roofs." Gaffer Dan Kerns explains that to simulate the burning streets, his crew set up numerous 'flicker boxes' that "pulse like a flame", in addition to simulated moonlight from "cherry picker"-like machines.

Acting
Actress Julie Benz says the flashback scenes are "the high points" of playing Darla; her favorite scene is the Boxer Rebellion. Gaffer Dan Kerns' girlfriend Heidi Strickler appears in that scene, playing the frightened mother in the alley whom Angel attempts to shelter.

Writing
This episode was writer Tim Minear's directorial debut. He says he felt it was time to explore Darla's history, which "should really be her story with Angel throughout the 150 years that they were together." When Joss Whedon pointed out that they were already doing a Spike origin story on Buffy the Vampire Slayer, Minear suggested they do both.

Although this episode shows Angel and Darla's romantic history, Minear cautions, "at no time was I trying to play this as being Angel's true love. It's more like the play Who's Afraid of Virginia Woolf?; this troubled, old married couple with secrets. I wasn't trying to take Buffy's place in his heart by any stretch of the imagination. But here's a guy who's been around for a couple of hundred years before he ever met Buffy and certainly he was shaped in some way."  He explains that despite cries of retconning from fans — who saw in the Buffy episode "Becoming, Part One" that Angel was living on the streets of New York in the early 1990s — he doesn't believe Angel was "thrown out of that room in Romania by Darla in 1898 and has been on the street ever since."

Minear likens the storytelling approach in this episode to the non-linear, looping technique exhibited by Quentin Tarantino's Pulp Fiction: "It's a different story happening in the same universe."

Reception

This episode won "Best Period Hair Styling in a Series" at the Hollywood Makeup Artist and Hair Stylist Guild Awards. Joss Whedon stated this episode as his all-time favorite episode, during an "Attack of the Show" interview.

References

External links

 

2000 American television episodes
Angel (season 2) episodes
Buffyverse crossover episodes
Television episodes set in Beijing
Television episodes set in London
Television episodes set in Virginia
Fiction set in 1609
Fiction set in 1760
Fiction set in 1898
Fiction set in 1900
Television episodes set in Romania
Qing dynasty in fiction
Television episodes directed by Tim Minear
Television episodes written by Tim Minear